Matthew Phillips (born 13 March 1991) is a professional footballer who plays as a winger for Championship club West Bromwich Albion and the Scotland national team.

Born in Aylesbury, Buckinghamshire to British born father of Barbadian descent and Scottish mother, Phillips began his career at Wycombe Wanderers before a move to Blackpool, and has also had a spell on loan at Sheffield United. He represented England at under-19 and under-20 level but has subsequently represented Scotland at senior level, qualifying through his grandparents' nationality.

Club career

Wycombe Wanderers
Phillips signed for Wycombe Wanderers at the age of eight when he was spotted playing in a five-a-side tournament. Having progressed through Wycombe's junior sides, he made his first team debut as an 82nd-minute substitute, a month after his seventeenth birthday, on 26 April 2008 in a 1–0 defeat to Notts County, the penultimate game of the 2007–08 season. His first start came a week later in the 2–1 win over Bradford City at Adams Park, in which he was voted man of the match by the Wycombe supporters.

After breaking into the first team during the previous season, Phillips signed his first professional contract in July 2008, a year before the end of his youth team scholarship. His first goal for the Chairboys came on 10 November 2008 in the 4–1 away win over AFC Wimbledon in the First Round of the 2008–09 FA Cup. His first league goal came on 6 December in the 3–2 away defeat to Aldershot Town.

Phillips went on to make a massive contribution to the Chairboys promotion from League Two in the 2008–09 season, becoming a regular on either the left or right wing, impressing with his ability to take on defenders and to cut inside. He was also won the club's two "Young Player of the Year" awards at the end of the season as well as the League Two "Apprentice of the Year".
Phillips was given the number 18 shirt for the 2009–10 season and continued his good form from the previous season, playing on either flank. In total, Phillips made 87 league and cup appearances for Wycombe, scoring nine goals.

Blackpool
Phillips signed for Premier League club Blackpool on 31 August 2010 in an original £350,000 deal, rising to £700,000 for achieving specific criteria. Manager Ian Holloway stated that he had been tracking Phillips for "a long time", saying of him, "Young Matty looked really exciting at times. He was skipping past people like they weren't there and now I've got to get him in our shape and working within it. He is definitely one for not only the long-term future but the immediate future. I am getting quite excited about what he might be able to produce."

Phillips' first team debut came on 25 September in the 2–1 home defeat to Blackburn Rovers. Phillips came on as a substitute in the 84th minute, making an instant impact, scoring his first ever Premier League goal just seconds later. After the match Ian Holloway praised Phillips saying, "I thought he was terrific. He's only 19 and he's someone who I think will have a good future. He played in a different role and smacked one in like that. Hopefully there is a lot, lot more to come from that boy because he has got some bits and pieces that would grace any level of football." Of his debut and goal Phillips said: "I've dreamt of playing in the Premier League since I was a kid, so to play Premier League football is one thing, but to go out there and make a mark on it is another, so I'm delighted." He made his full-debut against Aston Villa at Villa Park, a performance which led manager Ian Holloway to describe him as "at times un-markable".

After a successful spell on loan at Sheffield United, Phillips scored a hat-trick in Blackpool's Boxing Day 3–1 victory at Barnsley. He scored another hat-trick two weeks later, this time against Fleetwood Town in the FA Cup Third Round. Later that month Blackpool rejected a bid from Cardiff City, believed to be around £800,000, for the winger.

In the week before the start of the 2012–13 season Blackpool rejected a £5 million bid for Phillips from newly promoted Premier League side Southampton. He then put in a transfer request, and after being left out of the opening day victory over Millwall on 18 August, he returned to action three days later, scoring the winning goal in a 2–1 home victory over Leeds United.

Sheffield United (loan)
With first-team opportunities proving limited, Phillips agreed a months loan to Sheffield United in October 2011, making his début in the Steel City Derby a few days later. Phillips had a major impact in his month spell, scoring six goals in six appearances for the South Yorkshire club before returning to Bloomfield Road.

Queens Park Rangers
On 23 August 2013, Phillips signed for Queens Park Rangers on a four-year deal for an undisclosed fee and was handed the number 7 shirt. He made his debut for the club on 14 September, coming on as a first-half substitute for Junior Hoilett against Birmingham City. He scored his first goal for Queens Park Rangers on 3 December, netting the final goal in a 3–0 win over Bournemouth. His second goal for the club came eleven days later, when he scored the first in a 2–0 win over his former club Blackpool. His third goal was an equaliser against Doncaster Rovers in a league match at Loftus Road. QPR went on to win 2–1.

West Bromwich Albion
On 6 July 2016, Phillips joined Premier League side West Bromwich Albion on a four-year deal. Phillips got his first league goal in a win against reigning Premier League Champions Leicester City. He finished the game with an assist and the winning goal in the 2–1 win. Phillips continued his goal scoring exploits in the next game against Burnley F.C. He opened the scoring in the fourth minute and also set up a goal for Albion captain Darren Fletcher, helping the team to establish a 3–0 first half lead, in a game which ended as a 4–0 win. On 31 December he scored and set up Hal Robson-Kanu's first Albion goal in a 2–1 win over Southampton. He set up more goals for Chris Brunt and Gareth McAuley in a 3–1 win over Hull which took his tally up to 8 assists for the season.

On 5th August 2021, Phillips signed a contract extension until the summer of 2024.

International career
In May 2010, after initially being named as a standby, Phillips was called into the England under-19 squad for their upcoming European Championship Elite Qualifying Round matches. On 26 May he made his debut against the Republic of Ireland, coming on as a 76th-minute substitute for Jacob Mellis. Two days later he made his full debut and scored his first international goal in his next game against Bosnia and Herzegovina. In July 2010 Phillips was named in England's 18-man squad for the European Under-19 Championship. He scored a final-minute equaliser against France to send England through to the semi-finals of the tournament.

In February 2011, Phillips made his debut for the England under-20s in a 2–1 defeat to France. In June 2011, he was named in England's 21-man squad for the Under-20 World Cup. He started all three of England's group stage games plus their final-16 game, a 1–0 loss to Nigeria.

In January 2012, it was suggested that Scotland manager Craig Levein had been monitoring Phillips' progress, due to his eligibility through Phillips' Scottish grandparents. In February 2012, Levein duly called Phillips up to the Scotland squad to face Slovenia in a friendly; however, Phillips had to withdraw after suffering a hamstring injury.

Phillips finally made his Scotland debut in a 5–1 friendly loss to the United States on 26 May 2012 at EverBank Field, Jacksonville, Florida. He made his next appearance for Scotland on 16 October 2012 in a World Cup qualifier, coming on as a substitute in the 79th minute in a 2–0 defeat away against Belgium.

Career statistics

Club

International

International goals
As of match played 27 March 2018. Scotland score listed first, score column indicates score after each Phillips goal.

Honours
Individual
PFA Team of the Year: 2011–12 Championship

See also
List of Scotland international footballers born outside Scotland 
List of sportspeople who competed for more than one nation

References

External links

1991 births
Living people
Sportspeople from Aylesbury
English footballers
England youth international footballers
Scottish footballers
Scotland international footballers
Association football midfielders
Wycombe Wanderers F.C. players
Blackpool F.C. players
Sheffield United F.C. players
Queens Park Rangers F.C. players
West Bromwich Albion F.C. players
English Football League players
Premier League players
English people of Scottish descent
Black British sportsmen
Footballers from Buckinghamshire
English people of Jamaican descent